The Huntingdon Area School District, commonly abbreviated HASD, is a midsized rural public school district based in the borough of Huntingdon, Pennsylvania. The school district includes all of Huntingdon borough, Brady Township, Smithfield Township, Henderson Township, Juniata Township, Walker Township, Oneida Township, Penn Township, Marklesburg borough, Jackson Township, Mill Creek borough, Miller Township, and Lincoln Township. The school's mascot is the bearcat. The school's official colors are red and blue.

Schools
The Huntingdon Area School District operates one high school, one middle school, and two elementary schools. The district office is located at 2400 Cassady Avenue, Suite 2, Huntingdon, PA 16652.  
 Huntingdon Area High School - Huntingdon - Grades 9-12
2400 Cassady Avenue, Suite 1, Huntingdon, PA 16652
Opened in 1960, renovated/expanded in 2004
 Huntingdon Area Middle School - Huntingdon - Grades 6-8
2500 Cassady Avenue, Huntingdon, PA 16652 
Opened in 2012, former school opened in 1971
 Standing Stone Elementary School - Huntingdon - Grades K-5 
10 29th Street, Huntingdon, PA 16652
Opened in 1999 from the combined Alfarata Elementary and William Smith Elementary
 Southside Elementary School - McConnellstown - Grades K-5 
10906 Station Road, Huntingdon, PA 16652
Opened in 1997 from the combined Smithfield Elementary and Woodcock Valley Elementary

Extracurriculars
The district offers a variety of clubs, activities and sports.

Athletics
Below is a list of all sports offered at Huntingdon .

Fall Sports
Football
Boys' Soccer
Girls' Soccer
Girls' Volleyball
Field Hockey
Golf
Marching Band

Winter Sports
Boys' Basketball
Girls' Basketball
Wrestling
Swimming
Indoor Percussion

Spring Sports
Baseball
Softball
Track & Field
Boys' Volleyball

The high school has a long history of athletics. One of the school's most well known sports team is its volleyball team, which has enjoyed much success over the years, winning the PIAA state championship in 2003. Other school sports include basketball, swimming, baseball, softball, field hockey, soccer, wrestling, tennis, track & field, football and golf. The baseball team has also won a state championship.

Marching band and indoor percussion are offered to students in grades 7-12.

War Veterans' Field
This field is located in downtown Huntingdon. It is the home of the Huntingdon Bearcats football team.

Career and technology centers
Huntingdon County Career and Technology Center- Mill Creek borough- Grades 10-12

References

External links
 
 Tuscarora Intermediate Unit 11

School districts established in 1960
School districts in Huntingdon County, Pennsylvania
1960 establishments in Pennsylvania